Ceiba is a genus of trees.

Ceiba may also refer to:
La Ceiba, a port city on the northern coast of Honduras
Ceiba, Puerto Rico, a town and a municipality in northeast Puerto Rico
Ceiba, Cidra, Puerto Rico, a barrio
Ceiba, Las Piedras, Puerto Rico, a barrio
Ceiba, Vega Baja, Puerto Rico, a barrio
Ceiba, a botanical journal
CEIBA Intercontinental, an airline